Saint-Martin-du-Tertre is a commune in the Val-d'Oise department in Île-de-France in northern France. It was first attested in 1170 as "Sanctus Martinus de Colle".

See also
Communes of the Val-d'Oise department

References

External links
Official website 

Association of Mayors of the Val d'Oise 

Communes of Val-d'Oise